Envis Rebecca Williams (born 8 October 1962) is a Trinidadian former cricketer who played as a right-arm medium bowler. She appeared in one Test match and 21 One Day Internationals for the West Indies between 1997 and 2005. She played domestic cricket for Trinidad and Tobago.

References

External links
 
 

1962 births
Living people
People from Tobago
West Indian women cricketers
West Indies women Test cricketers
West Indies women One Day International cricketers
Trinidad and Tobago women cricketers
West Indian women cricket captains
Trinidad and Tobago women cricket captains